Laminin subunit beta-2 is a protein that in humans is encoded by the LAMB2 gene.

Function 

Laminins, a family of extracellular matrix glycoproteins, are the major noncollagenous constituent of basement membranes.  They have been implicated in a wide variety of biological processes including cell adhesion, differentiation, migration, signaling, neurite outgrowth and metastasis.  Laminins are composed of 3 non identical chains: laminin alpha, beta and gamma (formerly A, B1, and B2, respectively) and they form a cruciform structure consisting of 3 short arms, each formed by a different chain, and a long arm composed of all 3 chains.  Each laminin chain is a multidomain protein encoded by a distinct gene.  Several isoforms of each chain have been described.  Different alpha, beta and gamma chain isomers combine to give rise to different heterotrimeric laminin isoforms, which were formerly designated by Arabic numerals in the order of their discovery, e.g. alpha1beta1gamma1 heterotrimer was known as laminin 1, but the nomenclature now calls for using the numbers of each individual laminin subunit isoform, e.g. what was formerly Laminin 1 is now Laminin 111, and what was formerly Laminin 5 is now Laminin 332.  The biological functions of the different chains and trimer molecules are largely unknown, but some of the chains have been shown to differ with respect to their tissue distribution, presumably reflecting diverse functions in vivo.  This gene encodes the beta chain isoform laminin, beta 2.  The beta 2 chain contains the 7 structural domains typical of beta chains of laminin, including the short alpha region. However, unlike beta 1 chain, beta 2 has a more restricted tissue distribution.  It is enriched in the basement membrane of muscles at the neuromuscular junctions, kidney glomerulus and vascular smooth muscle.  Transgenic mice in which the beta 2 chain gene was inactivated by homologous recombination, showed defects in the maturation of neuromuscular junctions and impairment of glomerular filtration.  Alternative splicing involving a non consensus 5' splice site (gc) in the 5' UTR of this gene has been reported.  It was suggested that inefficient splicing of this first intron, which does not change the protein sequence, results in a greater abundance of the un

References

Further reading 

 
 
 
 
 
 
 
 
 
 
 
 
 
 
 
 

Laminins